Mauno Luukkonen (born 14 April 1934) is a Finnish biathlete. He competed in the 20 km individual event at the 1968 Winter Olympics.

References

1934 births
Living people
People from Pitkyarantsky District
Finnish male biathletes
Olympic biathletes of Finland
Biathletes at the 1968 Winter Olympics